
Gmina Bogatynia is an urban-rural gmina (administrative district) in Zgorzelec County, Lower Silesian Voivodeship, in south-western Poland, bordering both the Czech Republic and Germany.

Neighbouring gminas
Gmina Bogatynia is bordered by the town of Zawidów and the gmina of Zgorzelec. It also borders the Czech Republic and Germany.

Villages
Apart from the town of Bogatynia, the gmina contains the villages of Białopole, Bratków, Działoszyn, Jasna Góra, Kopaczów, Krzewina, Lutogniewice, Opolno-Zdrój, Porajów, Posada, Rybarzowice, Sieniawka, Wolanów and Wyszków.

Twin towns – sister cities

Gmina Bogatynia is twinned with:
 Hrádek nad Nisou, Czech Republic
 Zittau, Germany

References

Bogatynia
Zgorzelec County